The Ford Mainline is an automobile which was produced by Ford in the United States in the models years 1952 to 1956. It was introduced as the base trim level of the 1952 Ford range below the Customline and Crestline models. The Mainline retained its position in the redesigned 1955 Ford range  but was dropped for the 1957 model year when the Ford Custom became the new base model.

The Mainline was offered in 2-door sedan, 4-door sedan, 2-door coupe and 2-door station wagon body styles. The station wagon was marketed as the Mainline Ranch Wagon  until it lost its Mainline tag for the 1955 model year when all Ford wagons were moved to their own series. Mainlines were available with both inline six-cylinder and V8 engines.

Australian Ford Mainline Utility
In Australia the Mainline name was applied to a locally developed 2-door coupé utility version of the Ford Customline sedan from 1952. The Mainline utilized an imported station wagon chassis  with a large X-member from the Ford Sunliner convertible added  for additional load carrying strength. It sold alongside the Australian built Customline sedan, with both given yearly updates until production ceased in 1959.  The coupe utility slot in Ford Australia's lineup was filled by the first Ford Falcon utility the following year. Ford also sold a utility version of the English Zephyr 6 in the fifties and it was this ute which was closer in size and price to the first Falcon ute.  The Mainline like the Customline was a more expensive premium product in the Australian market.    The Mainline Utility was powered by an Australian produced version of the Ford side-valve V8 engine  until the introduction of the OHV V8 in the redesigned 1955 series.

Gallery

See also
GAZ-21

References

External links

Chino Hills Ford Website

Mainline
Motor vehicles manufactured in the United States
Cars of Australia